Stuttgarter Volksbank eG operates as a cooperative bank. The bank offers financial and investment services. The bank is based in Stuttgart, Germany.

References

Cooperative banks of Germany
Companies based in Stuttgart